Charles Patrick Pfarrer III (born April 13, 1957) is an American writer, film producer, and former  Navy SEAL. As an author, he has penned published screenplays, novels, comic book, and non-fiction works. His works deal with themes pertaining to the military.  Pfarrer has worked on  films including Navy SEALs, Darkman, and Hard Target.

Early life and education
Pfarrer was born April 13, 1957, in Boston, Massachusetts, the son of Charles Patrick Pfarrer, Jr., a career naval officer, and Joan Marie Pfarrer, a registered nurse.

He graduated from Staunton Military Academy in 1975, and studied Clinical Psychology at California State University, Northridge and the University of Bath in the United Kingdom.

Career

Military career
Pfarrer entered active duty with the United States Navy in October 1980 and completed Officer Candidate School in Newport, R.I in 1981. After his commission as an Ensign in the U.S. Navy, he reported to Basic Underwater Demolition/SEAL training (BUD/S) at Naval Amphibious Base Coronado. After six months of training, Pfarrer graduated with BUD/S class 114 in September 1981. Following SEAL Tactical Training (STT) and completion of six month probationary period, he received the 1130 designator as a Naval Special Warfare Officer, entitled to wear the Special Warfare insignia and spent the next five years as a Navy SEAL. His initial assignment was to Underwater Demolition Team TWENTY ONE (UDT-21) at Naval Amphibious Base Little Creek, Virginia. 

Pfarrer deployed numerous times as a military advisor in Central America, trained NATO forces in Europe and the Mediterranean, and completed a combat deployment in 1983 to Beirut during the Lebanese Civil War when UDT-21 was redesignated as SEAL Team FOUR. As SEAL Assistant Platoon commander assigned to the Multi-National Peacekeeping Force, he witnessed the 1983 Marine barracks bombing in Beirut. In September 1984, Pfarrer reported to SEAL Team SIX in Training Support Center Hampton Roads to begin an eight-month specialized selection and training course to become a counterterrorist operator. In October 1985, Pfarrer was one of the SEAL Team assault leaders responsible for the apprehension of Abu Abbas and the hijackers of the cruise ship Achille Lauro. Pfarrer ended his naval service in June 1986 as Assault Element Commander at the United States Naval Special Warfare Development Group (DEVGRU).

Writing career

Screenwriter
While still in the Navy, Pfarrer sold a spec script that he wrote in college. His film credits include writing, acting and production work in Navy SEALs, Darkman, Barb Wire and Hard Target. Pfarrer's other screenwriting credits include The Jackal, Virus and Red Planet. He became a member of the Western branch of the Writers Guild of America.

He is an uncredited writer on the films Sudden Impact and Arlington Road, and wrote early drafts for Shooter and The Green Hornet. He is the author and creator of six graphic novels for Dark Horse Comics, and wrote and produced two interactive full motion videos, Flash Traffic and Silent Steel, both for Tsunami Media.

Pfarrer's screenplay, Crash Site, was in development as a feature film by ALCON media. It was to be directed by Academy Award-winning director Charlie Gibson and produced by John Bladecchhi and Alcon co-chiefs Broderick Johnson and Andrew Kosove.

Fiction
His first published novel, Killing Che, was released in 2007.

Pfarrer's second novel, a work of nautical fiction, was published by the United States Naval Institute Press in April 2016. Based on the epic American short story of the same name by Edward Everett Hale, Philip Nolan, The Man Without a Country is a novelization of Hale's story, and tells of Nolan's court martial and his life as a prisoner on an American ship.

Non-fiction
Pfarrer was active in the 2004 effort to recall Writers Guild of America president Charles Holland, who had falsely claimed to be a wounded combat veteran, intelligence officer and Green Beret. Holland later resigned.

Pfarrer's best-selling autobiography, Warrior Soul, The Memoir of a Navy SEAL, was published in 2003.

Pfarrer is the author of the 2011 book SEAL Target Geronimo: The Inside Story of the Mission to Kill Osama bin Laden, a New York Times best-seller, which was controversial because he gave a different account of the raid than had the government.

He has written op-eds for The New York Times and the Knight Ridder syndicate. He has appeared as an author and counter-terrorism expert on CSPAN-2, NPR, the Arabic network Al Hurra, IPR, Voice of America, Fox News, ABC, America Tonight and The Australian Broadcast Company.

Bibliography

Film

Print

Video games

Awards and decorations

References

External links 

1957 births
Staunton Military Academy alumni
California State University, Northridge alumni
Alumni of the University of Bath
Living people
21st-century American novelists
American male screenwriters
21st-century American memoirists
American male novelists
21st-century American historians
American spy fiction writers
People from Biloxi, Mississippi
United States Navy officers
United States Navy SEALs personnel
Novelists from Mississippi
21st-century American male writers
American male non-fiction writers
Screenwriters from Virginia
Screenwriters from Mississippi
Screenwriters from California
21st-century American screenwriters